GaMogopa is a 99% Black African village in Dr Kenneth Kaunda District Municipality, North West Province, South Africa. It is situated 25 km north of Ventersdorp. Mogopa as a small village has known bloggers such as Isaac More.

References

Populated places in the JB Marks Local Municipality